Russell Lewis is a British television writer.

Russell Lewis may also refer to:

 Russell A. Lewis (1895–1966), American college football coach
 Russell Lewis (chairman), former chairman of the Bow Group
 Russell Lewis (choreographer),  dance director nominated for Academy Award for Best Dance Direction
 Russell Lewis (footballer) (born 1956), Welsh footballer
 Russell T. Lewis (born 1947), CEO of the New York Times Company